Atlas is the debut album of the alternative dance group Rüfüs, released in Australia under Sweat It Out on 9 August 2013. The album debuted at number 1 on the ARIA Albums Chart on 25 August 2013.

At the J Awards of 2013, the album was nominated for Australian Album of the Year.

Singles 
The album was preceded by "Take Me" as the lead single on 8 March 2013 and "Desert Night" as the second single on 21 June 2013. "Tonight" was released as the third single on 22 November 2013, followed by "Sundream" as the fourth and final single on 21 March 2014.

Track listing

Personnel

Musicians
Rüfüs
 Tyrone Lindqvist – vocals, guitar
 Jon George – keyboards
 James Hunt – drums

Other musicians
 Jess Pollard – vocals

Technical
 Darren Ziesing – mastering
 Cassian Stewart-Kasimba – mixing

Artwork
 Nick George – cover artwork

Charts and certifications

Weekly charts

Year-end charts

Certifications

Release history

References 

2013 debut albums
ARIA Award-winning albums
Rüfüs Du Sol albums
Experimental pop albums